Robert Douglas (1594–1674) was the only minister of the Church of Scotland to be Moderator of the General Assembly five times.

Robert Douglas was son of Robert Douglas, an illegitimate son of Sir George Douglas of Lochleven, brother of William, 
fifth Earl of Morton. He was educated at University of St Andrews, graduating with an M.A. in 1614. He was licensed as a church minister about 1617. Almost immediately afterwards he was engaged as chaplain to one of the brigades of Scottish auxiliaries co-operating with Gustavus Adolphus in the Thirty Years' War. During that period he is said to have had no other book to read but the Bible, and committed nearly the whole of it to memory. 

Returning to Scotland he became "second charge" minister of Kirkcaldy Parish Church, in 1628. He was a member of the General Assembly in 1638, and was translated, in 1639 to the Second Charge of St Giles in Edinburgh. In 1641 he was moved to the Tolbooth Parish (still within St Giles). He was Moderator of the General Assembly in 1642 (and also in 1645, 1647, 1649, and 1651). In 1643 he was elected a Commissioner to the Assembly of Divines in a delegation sent to Westminster in London. In 1644 he was chaplain to one of the Scots Regiments in England.

In 1649 he was again minister of St Giles, and assisted in the presentation of the Solemn League and Covenant to Parliament. In 1650 he was one of the ministers who waited on Charles II. at Dunfermline, to obtain his signature to a declaration of religion; when Charles refused to sign, 
and a serious division of the Church ensued. Douglas became a leader of the Resolutioners, the moderate party. On 1 January 
1651 he preached at the coronation of Charles II at Scone. Sent prisoner to London by Cromwell in 1653, he was soon released. In 1654 he was summoned to London (with others) to consult with the Protector upon the affairs of the Church of Scotland. In 1659 he preached the sermon at the opening of Heriot's Hospital. In 1661 he preached before Parliament. After the Restoration he was offered the Bishopric of Edinburgh, but indignantly declined, and remonstrated with Sharp for accepting the Archbishopric of St Andrews.

On 27 June 1662 he was translated to Greyfriars, Edinburgh, but refusing to conform to Episcopacy, he was deprived on 1 October of the same year. He was admitted as an "indulged minister" to Pencaitland on 2 September 1669, and died (buried 6th) February 1674. "No man," it was said, " contributed more to the Restoration, and received less benefit from it."

Life
He was son of George Douglas, governor of Laurence, Lord Oliphant; the father was said to be an illegitimate son of Sir George Douglas of Lochleven, brother of Sir William Douglas, 6th Earl of Morton. Sir George helped Mary Queen of Scots to escape from Lochleven in 1567, and at the end of the seventeenth century the Scottish historians stated that Queen Mary was the mother of Sir George's illegitimate son. Gilbert Burnet states, in the manuscript copy of his 'History of his own Time' in the British Museum, that the rumour that Robert Douglas was Queen Mary's grandson was very common in his day, and that Douglas 'was not ill-pleased to have this story pass.' Wodrow (Analecta, iv. 226) repeats the tale on the authority of 'Old Mr. Patrick Simson,' and suggests that it was familiar to most Scotchmen. But the report may be a Whig fiction fabricated about Queen Mary to discredit the Jacobites of the seventeenth and eighteenth centuries. He was educated at the University of St Andrews, where he took the degree of M.A. in 1614.

He became minister of Kirkaldy in 1628, and a year later was offered a charge at South Leith, which he declined. He became chaplain to one of the brigades of Scottish auxiliaries sent with the connivance of Charles I to the aid of Gustavus Adolphus in the Thirty Years' War. Gustavus landed in Germany in June 1630; Robert Wodrow, in his 'Analecta,' gives several anecdotes, showing how he appreciated Douglas's advice. Returning to Scotland, he was elected in 1638 member of the General Assembly, and in the following year was chosen for the second charge of the High Church in Edinburgh. In 1641 he was removed to the Tolbooth Church, and in July of the same year preached a sermon before the Scottish parliament. In the following year he was chosen moderator of the general assembly—a post he also held in 1645, 1647, 1649, and 1651—and in 1643 he was named one of the commissioners of the  Westminster Assembly.

In 1644 he was chaplain to one of the Scottish regiments in England, an account of which he gives in his 'Diary'. In 1649 he was retransferred to the High Church in Edinburgh (St Giles), and with other commissioners presented the Solemn League and Covenant to the parliament, and was appointed a commissioner for visiting the universities of Edinburgh, Aberdeen, and St Andrews. In the following year he was one of the ministers who waited on Charles II at Dunfermline to obtain his signature to a declaration of religion; but as this document reflected on his father, Charles refused to sign it. The result was a division in the Scotch church on the matter, Douglas being a leader of the resolutioners, the party which preferred to treat the king leniently.

The Church of Scotland was now unhappily split into two contending sections. Old friends who had fought side by side in earlier days became opponents, and there was much bitterness and occasionally misrepresentations, due in some cases to misunderstandings, exaggerated reports or false rumours. Of the Resolutioners, Robert Douglas was, by head and shoulders, the acknowledged leader. His ministerial supporters included David Dickson, Robert Baillie, and James Wood. Among the Protesters the most outstanding ministers were James Guthrie, Samuel Rutherfurd, Andrew Cant, Patrick Gillespie, and John Livingstone; and, of the elders, Wariston and Sir John Cheisly; the two most strenuous fighters being Guthrie and Wariston.

In January 1651 Douglas officiated at the coronation of Charles II at Scone, preaching a sermon in which he said that it was the king's duty to maintain the established religion of Scotland, and to bring the other religions of the kingdom into conformity with it.

Douglas was sent prisoner to London by Oliver Cromwell, when he suppressed the Scotch royalists, but was released in 1653. In 1654 he was called to London with other eminent ministers to consult with the Protector on the affairs of the Church of Scotland. Douglas was now the acknowledged leader of the moderate presbyterians or 'public resolutioners,' and retained the position till the English Restoration, which he largely helped to bring about. In 1659 he joined with the other resolutioners in sending James Sharp to London to attend to the interests of the Scottish church, and Wodrow (Sufferings of the Church of Scotland) gives most of the correspondence which took place between them. In this year Douglas preached the sermon at the opening of Heriot's Hospital.

After the Restoration Douglas was offered the bishopric of Edinburgh if he would agree to the introduction of episcopacy into Scotland, but declined the office, and remonstrated with Sharp for accepting the archbishopric of St. Andrews. He preached before the Scottish Parliament in Edinburgh in 1661, and 27 June 1662 was removed to the pastorate of Greyfriars Kirk. For declining to recognise episcopacy Douglas was deprived of this charge on 1 October 1662.

In 1669 the privy council licensed him as an indulged minister to the parish of Pencaitland in East Lothian. He died in 1674, aged 80.

Works
Hew Scott's list:

 'The Diary of Mr. Robert Douglas when with the Scottish Army in England,' 1644. 
 'A Sermon preached at Scone, January the first, 1651, at the Coronation of Charles II,' 1651. The text is given in Kerr.  An audio recording of this sermon is on YouTube.
 'Master Douglas, his Sermon preached at the Down-sitting of the last Parliament of Scotland,' 1661.

Family
He married (1) Margaret Kirkaldie, and (2) Margaret Boyd on 20 August 1646. By the former he was father of Thomas, Janet, Alexander, minister of Logie Kirk, Elizabeth, Archibald, and Robert. He had also two children (Robert and Margaret) by his second wife.

He married (1) Margaret Kirkaldy, and had issue — James, of Earnslaw (Fife Sets., xii., 289) ; Thomas, who died before 1667, when Alexander is called second son (G. R. Inhib., 12 March 1680); Janet ; Alexander, minister of Logie ; Patrick, bapt. 28th Jan. 1642 (marr. Margaret Lothian), died before 1673 (G. R. Inhib., 26th Jan. 1674): 
Elizabeth, bapt. 3rd Jan. 1643; Archibald, bapt. 8th Jan. 1644; Robert: (2) 20th Aug. 1646, Margaret Boyd, who survived him, and was buried 13 July 1692, and had issue — Eobert; Margaret, bapt. 18 July 1658.

Bibliography
Hew Scott's:
Kirkton's, Burnet's, and Wodrow's Hists. ; 
Law's Memorials, 
Guthrey's Memoirs; 
Notes and Queries (1st series), iv., 299, (2nd series), vi., 50-1 ; 
Dict. Nat. Biog.
Bickley's:
Kirkton's Secret Hist. of the Church of Scotland, p. 288; 
Guthrey's Memoirs, p. 190; 
Stephen's Hist. of the Church of Scotland, pt. ii. p. 176 (1845); 
Johnstone's Collection, &c., pp. 328, 445–9; 
Hetherington's Hist. of the Church of Scotland (1852); 
Chambers's Eminent Scotsmen, vol. i.; 
Wodrow's Sufferings of the Clergy in Scotland; 
Wodrow's Analecta; 
Hew Scott's Fasti Ecclesiæ Scotic. i. 21, 26, &c.; 
Notes and Queries, 1st ser. iv. 299, 2nd ser. xi. 50–1

External links
The National Covenants Coronation Sermon at Scone by Robert Douglas (audio) YouTube

References
Citations

Sources

1594 births
1674 deaths
Moderators of the General Assembly of the Church of Scotland
Scottish Commissioners at the Westminster Assembly
17th-century Ministers of the Church of Scotland
Alumni of the University of St Andrews